Alexander Fennell is a game designer who has worked primarily on role-playing games.

Career
Alex Fennell was a Captain in the British army. When he was on his way out of the army in late 2000, and was considering his next career, Fennell met Matthew Sprange in a pub in Swindon, England, who suggested starting a game company. Fennell was unconvinced and instead joined a 3G (third generation) mobile communication company.  After six months of working in mobile communications, Fennell was interested in taking on a more creative job, and when Sprange contacted him about forming the game company Mongoose Publishing to publish adventures under Wizards of the Coast's d20 license, Fennell joined him. Thanks to good sales on their first product, The Slayer's Guide to Hobgoblins (2001), Fennell gave up his day job and became Mongoose's first employee with Sprange joining him a month later. Fennell used his saved army wages to make sure the company could pay to publish a book a month, even before they started getting payments back from distributors. Fennell left Mongoose in 2009.

References

External links
 

British Army officers
Living people
Place of birth missing (living people)
Role-playing game designers
Year of birth missing (living people)